Saponaria officinalis is a common perennial plant from the family Caryophyllaceae. This plant has many common names, including common soapwort, bouncing-bet, crow soap, wild sweet William, and soapweed. There are about 20 species of soapworts altogether.

The scientific name Saponaria is derived from the Latin  (stem ) meaning "soap", which, like its common name, refers to its utility in cleaning. From this same Latin word is derived the name of the toxic substance saponin, contained in the roots at levels up to 20 percent when the plant is flowering (Indian soapnuts contain only 15 percent). It produces a lather when in contact with water. The epithet officinalis indicates its medicinal functions. It is a common host plant for some moth species, including the white-lined sphinx.

Saponaria officinalis native range extends throughout Europe, and in Asia to western Siberia. It grows in cool places at low or moderate elevations under hedgerows and along the shoulders of roadways. It can be found as a horticultural escape and noxious invasive in much of North America.

Description
The plant possesses leafy, unbranched stems (often tinged with red). The broad, lanceolate, sessile leaves are opposite and between 4 and 12 cm long. Its sweetly scented flowers are radially symmetrical and pink, or sometimes white. Each of the five flat petals have two small scales in the throat of the corolla. They are arranged in dense, terminal clusters on the main stem and its branches. The long tubular calyx has five pointed red teeth.

The individual flowers open in the evening, and stay open for about three days. They produce a stronger scent at night and supplement nectar production during the night. The flowers are protandrous: on the second night of blooming, the pollen is released, and the stigma develops to its final position by the third night. Much of the seed production comes from self-pollination. The flowers are visited by various insects including Noctuidae, Sphingidae, bumblebees, and hoverflies.

In the Northern Hemisphere Saponaria officinalis blooms from May to September, and in the Southern Hemisphere October to March.

External use
As its common name implies, it can be used as a very gentle soap, usually in dilute solution. It has historically been used to clean delicate or unique textiles, especially woollen fabrics; it has been hypothesized that the plant was used to treat the Shroud of Turin.

A lathery liquid that has the ability to dissolve fats or grease can be procured by boiling the leaves or roots in water.  Leaves are chopped, boiled, and strained; the liquid can then be used as soap.

In the Romanian village of Șieu-Odorhei, natives call the plant . It is traditionally used by the villagers as a soap replacement for dry skin.

Internal use
An overdose can cause nausea, diarrhea, and vomiting.

Despite its toxic potential, Saponaria officinalis finds culinary use as an emulsifier in the commercial preparation of tahini and in brewing to create beer with a good head. In the Middle East, the root is often used as an additive in the process of making halva. The plant is used to stabilize the oils in the mixture and to create the distinctive texture of halvah.

Chemistry
Saponaria officinalis contains the flavone saponarin.

References

External links

 "SEINet Portal Network - Saponaria officinalis"
 "Saponaria officinalis 'Flore Pleno' - Plant Finder"
 "Saponaria officinalis"

Caryophyllaceae
Medicinal plants of Europe
Plants described in 1753
Taxa named by Carl Linnaeus
Saponaceous plants